Eurogliders are a band formed in 1980 in Perth, Western Australia, which included Grace Knight on vocals, Bernie Lynch on guitar and vocals, and Amanda Vincent on keyboards. In 1984, Eurogliders released an Australian top ten album, This Island, which spawned their No. 2 hit single, "Heaven (Must Be There)". "Heaven" also peaked at No. 21 on the United States Billboard Mainstream Rock charts and appeared on the Hot 100. Another Australian top ten album, Absolutely, followed in 1985, which provided two further local top ten singles, "We Will Together", and "Can't Wait to See You". They disbanded in 1989, with Knight having a successful career as a jazz singer. Australian rock music historian Ian McFarlane described Eurogliders as "the accessible face of post-punk new wave music. The band's sophisticated brand of pop was traditional in its structure, but displayed the decidedly 'modern veneer' (hip clothes, heavy use of synthesiser)". The band reformed in 2005 releasing two new albums followed in 2014 by their seventh album.

History

Early days (1980–1982)

Guitarist and singer Bernie Lynch (as Rip Torn) fronted a new wave band, The Stockings, in Perth, Western Australia in the late 1970s. He left in early 1980 to form Living Single, with keyboard player Amanda Vincent. Together, they recruited Crispin Akerman on guitar, Don Meharry on bass guitar and Guy Slingerland on drums through a series of advertisements. The following year, Grace Knight – Lynch's future domestic partner – joined as lead vocalist. By the end of 1981, drummer John Bennetts replaced Slingerland and the band changed their name to Eurogliders. They were signed by manager, Brian Peacock, to their first recording and publishing contracts with PolyGram. They recruited Melbourne bass player Geoff Rosenberg to replace Meharry. In 1982, Eurogliders travelled to Manila, capital of the Philippines, to record their first album, Pink Suit Blue Day, produced by Englishman Lem Lubin, which did not peak into the top 50 of the Australian Kent Music Report albums chart. From Manila, they relocated to Sydney to release their first single in June, "Without You", which peaked into the top 40 on the Kent Music Report singles chart.

International success (1983–1985)

Eurogliders changed record labels from Polygram to CBS in 1983. They replaced bass guitarist, Rosenberg, with Scott Saunders and travelled to the UK in July. While there, they recruited bass guitarist Ron François, formerly of The Sinceros, The Teardrop Explodes and Lene Lovich. With this line-up they recorded This Island, produced by Nigel Gray (also worked with the Police) which was released in May and peaked at No. 4 on the Australian albums chart. The single, "Heaven (Must Be There)", also released in May, reached No. 2 on the Australian singles charts.  Released several months later in North America, the single peaked at No. 47 in Canada, and at No. 65 on the US Billboard Hot 100 chart. The album peaked at No. 140 on the Billboard 200 chart. In Australia, "Heaven" was followed by a domino effect of two more top 10 hits, with "We Will Together" (No. 7, April 1985),  and "Can't Wait to See You" (No. 8, November 1985). Their third album Absolutely, which peaked at No. 7, spent 47 weeks in the Australian charts. Between 1984 and 1986, Eurogliders toured Australia, the USA, Canada, Puerto Rico, Japan and New Zealand.

At the height of the band's success, Grace Knight and Bernie Lynch reconciled their relationship and were married in 1985 but the union was short-lived. Despite their marital separation, they stayed together in the band for another four years. Lynch and Knight dismissed Brian Peacock, and took over the band's management.

Demise (1986–1989)

In early 1987, journalists documented Lynch and Knight's claim that Bennetts, François and Vincent left the band voluntarily. Vincent went to London on a world tour with the Thompson Twins, and stayed in the UK to tour and co-wrote with Boy George. François became a session musician in Australia, while Bennets toured with Eartha Kitt, and later worked in the Educational IT industry before founding Monkeydrum Studios.

Reduced to a duo, Lynch and Knight recorded their fourth album (Groove) with session musicians, including Akerman.  However, despite Akerman's presence on the album it was clear that Lynch and Knight by themselves were now the Eurogliders, as they were the only people pictured on the album cover or inner sleeve, or on any of the album's associated singles.

Groove peaked at No. 25 on the Australian charts in April 1988. The related single, "Groove" had peaked at No. 13 in February but the next singles, "It Must Be Love" in June, "Listen" in September and "Precious" in March 1989 did not reach the top 50.

For the album tour, Lynch, Knight and Akerman were joined by Guy Le Claire on guitar, Rex Goh on guitar (ex-Air Supply), Lindsay Jehan on bass guitar and Steve Sowerby on drums.  Later in 1989, the Eurogliders disbanded. Akerman returned to his visual art background and became a painter, Lynch initially pursued a solo music career; while Knight became a successful jazz singer.

Post-Eurogliders (1990–2005)
After Eurogliders, Knight made a cameo appearance in the 1990 TV series Come In Spinner and sang on its soundtrack, Come In Spinner, recorded with jazz artist Vince Jones, which peaked at No. 4 on the Australian Recording Industry Association (ARIA) albums charts. This launched a new career for Knight as a jazz singer with her first solo album, Stormy Weather, which peaked at No. 16 in 1991. Lynch became involved in theatre and soundtrack composition, and as the business manager of his second wife, fashion designer Collette Dinnigan. Vincent, who had a successful popular music career with credits including Boy George, Gang of Four and Billy Bragg, moved into ethnomusicology, specialising in African and Cuban music.

Reformations

Eurogliders reformed in October 2005, with Grace Knight and Bernie Lynch using session musicians including former member, Rex Goh, and they released their fifth studio album, simply called Eurogliders and included the single, "Hummingbird", but neither album nor single peaked into the ARIA top 50 charts. They started touring again in April 2006 and performed on the Countdown Spectacular during June to August, which was a nostalgic tour of Australian bands from the 1970s and 1980s, as featured on the pop television show Countdown with its host Ian "Molly" Meldrum. The group's sixth album, Blue Kiss, was recorded during the same sessions as the previous and was released in mid-2006, it also had no top 50 charting. Eurogliders official website was shut down in September 2008. In 2013 it was announced that the Eurogliders were expected to reform to support The Boomtown Rats on a planned reunion tour of Australia in May. However, the tour was cancelled due to poor ticket sales. Their seventh studio album, Don't Eat the Daisies, appeared in 2014. In May 2017 they headlined the entertainment on Darley Kingsford-Smith Cup Day during the Brisbane Winter Racing Carnival. Eurogliders plan to tour Australia in support of Simple Minds and OMD in December 2021.

Members

Eurogliders' members (arranged chronologically):
 Bernie Lynch – vocals, guitar, keyboards (1980–1989, 2005–2007, 2013-)
 Amanda Vincent – keyboards (1980–1987)
 Crispin Akerman – guitar (1980–1987)
 Don Meharry – bass guitar (1980–1981)
 Guy Slingerland – drums (1980–1981)
 Grace Knight – vocals, saxophone, keyboards (1981–1989, 2005–2007, 2013-)
 John Bennetts – drums, percussion (1981–1987)
 Stephen Clarke - drums (1981)
 Geoff Rosenberg – bass guitar (1981–1983)
 Ron François – bass guitar, backing vocals (1983–1987)
 Scott Saunders – bass (1983)
 Rex Goh – guitar (1988–1989)
 Lindsay Jehan – bass guitar (1988–1989)
 Guy Le Claire – guitar (1988–1989)
 Joy Smithers – backing vocals (1988–1989)
 Steve Sowerby – drums (1988–1989)
 Phil Whitcher – Keyboards (1988-1989)

Discography

Studio albums

Compilation albums

Singles

Awards and nominations

Countdown Australian Music Awards
Countdown was an Australian pop music TV series on national broadcaster ABC-TV from 1974–1987, it presented music awards from 1979–1987, initially in conjunction with magazine TV Week. The TV Week / Countdown Awards were a combination of popular-voted and peer-voted awards.

|-
| rowspan="2" |1982
| "Pink Suit Blue Day"
| Best Debut Album
| 
|-
| "Without You"
| Best Debut Single
| 
|-
| rowspan="5" |1984
| rowspan="2" | "Heaven Must Be There"
| Best Single
| 
|-
| Best Video
| 
|-
| Themselves in "Heaven Must Be There"
| Best Group Performance in a Video
| 
|-
| Bernie Lynch (Eurogliders)
| Best Songwriter
| 
|-
| Grace Knight
| Most Popular Female Performer
| 
|-
| 1986
| Grace Knight
| Most Popular Female Performer
| 
|-

West Australian Music Industry Awards
The West Australian Music Industry Awards are annual awards celebrating achievements for Western Australian music. They commenced in 1985.

|-
| 2017 || Eurogliders || Hall of Fame || 
|-

References

Further reading

External links
 Grace Knight's Official website

Musical groups established in 1980
Musical groups from Perth, Western Australia
Australian new wave musical groups
Australian pop music groups
Australian post-punk groups
CBS Records artists